Hopkins Village is a coastal village in eastern Belize.

Culture 
Hopkins is a Garifuna village on the coast of the Stann Creek District in Belize. Hopkins is considered by some Belizeans to be the cultural center of the Garifuna population in Belize. The town hosts its own national holiday, Hopkins Day, and welcomes people for their celebration on Garifuna Independence Day as well, they do this with drum ceremonies that can last till early hours in the morning.

Geography 
The village is separated into two parts; the Northside (Baila) and the Southside (False Sittee). Hopkins is surrounded by the Maya Mountains and the Cockscomb Range inland, and the Caribbean Sea on its shore. It is also very close to the Sittee River.  The village was created in 1942 to replace the village of Newtown, which was devastated by a hurricane further up the coast.

Official Hopkins Belize website

Garifuna communities
Populated places in Stann Creek District